Cyrus Ali Zargar is an Islamic studies scholar and the Endowed Al-Ghazali Distinguished Professor in Islamic Studies at the University of Central Florida in Orlando, Florida. His research mainly focuses on Islamic philosophy, Arabic and Persian literature of medieval Sufism, Classical Sufism and Ethics in literature and film.

Biography
Zarger completed his BA in English Literature in 2000 from the University of California, Los Angeles. He received his MA and PhD in Near Eastern Studies in 2003 and 2008 respectively from the University of California, Berkeley. He has taught at many different institutions including Augustana College, in Rock Island, Illinois, San Francisco State University and University of California, Berkeley. Zarger is a member of American Academy of Religion.

Works
 Sufi Aesthetics: Beauty, Love, and the Human Form in the Writings of Ibn 'Arabi and 'Iraqi. Columbia, South Carolina: University of South Carolina Press, 2011. 
 The Polished Mirror: Storytelling and the Pursuit of Virtue in Islamic Philosophy and Sufism. London: Oneworld, December 2017.

References

Sources

External links
 Official Web page at UFC

Year of birth missing (living people)
Living people
Place of birth missing (living people)
American Islamic studies scholars
University of California, Los Angeles alumni
UC Berkeley College of Letters and Science alumni
San Francisco State University faculty
Augustana College (Illinois) faculty
University of Central Florida faculty
Muslim scholars of Islamic studies